Troy Taylor may refer to:
 Troy Taylor (American football) (born 1968), American football coach
 Troy Taylor (cricketer) (born 1984), English cricketer
 Troy Taylor (Australian footballer) (born 1991), Australian rules footballer
 Troy Taylor (record producer), American singer, songwriter, and producer